The Oldfield River is an ephemeral river in the Goldfields-Esperance region of Western Australia that rises  inland from the South Coast at the edge of the Yilgarn plateau.

The river gently undulates through sandstone forming gentle valleys with many granite outcrops, the river then carves deeper valleys through the siltstone before entering the coastal plain. 
The river is then joined by its tributary, the Munglinup River, before flowing into the Oldfield estuary which discharges into the Southern Ocean.

The only other tributary of the Oldfield River is Coujinup Creek.

The river is regarded as saline with high nutrient levels, moderate sedimentation, moderate fringing vegetation and has a low flood risk.

Named as Oldfield river by the settler Michael Simon Dempster in a letter written in 1866, the river is thought to have been named after Augustus Frederick Oldfield a plant collector who was active around the south coast of Western Australia. The river was most likely named by Albert Young Hassell of Jerramungup who explored the area in 1861.

References

Rivers of the Goldfields-Esperance region